Azhdarchidae (from the Persian word , , a dragon-like creature in Persian mythology) is a family of pterosaurs known primarily from the Late Cretaceous Period, though an isolated vertebra apparently from an azhdarchid is known from the Early Cretaceous as well (late Berriasian age, about 140 million years ago). Azhdarchids included some of the largest known flying animals of all time, but smaller cat-size members have also been found. Originally considered a sub-family of Pteranodontidae, Nesov (1984) named the Azhdarchinae to include the pterosaurs Azhdarcho, Quetzalcoatlus, and Titanopteryx (now known as Arambourgiania). They were among the last known surviving members of the pterosaurs, and were a rather successful group with a worldwide distribution. By the time of the end-Cretaceous mass extinction, most pterosaur families except for the Azhdarchidae disappear from the fossil record, but recent studies indicate a wealth of pterosaurian fauna, including pteranodontids, nyctosaurids, tapejarids and several indeterminate forms. In several analyses, some taxa such as Navajodactylus, Bakonydraco and Montanazhdarcho were moved from Azhdarchidae to other clades.

Description

Azhdarchids are characterized by their long legs and extremely long necks, made up of elongated neck vertebrae which are round in cross section. Most species of azhdarchids are still known mainly from their distinctive neck bones and not much else. The few azhdarchids that are known from reasonably good skeletons include Zhejiangopterus and Quetzalcoatlus. Azhdarchids are also distinguished by their relatively large heads and long, spear-like jaws. There are two major types of azhdarchid morphologies: the "blunt-beaked" forms with shorter and deeper bills and the "slender-beaked" forms with longer and thinner jaws.

It had been suggested azhdarchids were skimmers, but further research has cast doubt on this idea, demonstrating that azhdarchids lacked the necessary adaptations for a skim-feeding lifestyle, and that they may have led a more terrestrial existence similar to modern storks and ground hornbills. Most large azhdarchids probably fed on small prey, including hatchling and small dinosaurs; in an unusual modification of the azhdarchid bodyplan, the robust Hatzegopteryx may have tackled larger prey as the apex predator in its ecosystem. In another departure from typical azhdarchid lifestyles, the jaw of Alanqa may possibly be an adaptation to crushing shellfish and other hard foodstuffs.

Another azhdarchid that is currently unnamed, recently discovered in Transylvania, may be the largest representative of the family thus far discovered.

Systematics
Azhdarchids were originally classified as close relatives of Pteranodon due to their long, toothless beaks. Others have suggested they were more closely related to the toothy ctenochasmatids (which include filter-feeders like Ctenochasma and Pterodaustro). Currently it is widely agreed that azhdarchids were closely related to pterosaurs such as Tupuxuara and Tapejara.

Taxonomy
Classification after Unwin 2006, except where noted.

 Family Azhdarchidae
Aerotitan
 Alanqa
 Aralazhdarcho
 Arambourgiania
Azhdarcho
Cretornis
Eurazhdarcho
Hatzegopteryx
Mistralazhdarcho
Montanazhdarcho?
Palaeocursornis
Phosphatodraco
Quetzalcoatlus
Volgadraco
Zhejiangopterus
 Possible valid azhdarchid genera
 Argentinadraco? (azhdarchoid, tentatively classified as an azhdarchid)
Bennettazhia
Bogolubovia
Navajodactylus?

Phylogeny 

The most complete cladogram of azhdarchids is presented by Andres (2021):

In the analysis Cretornis and Volgadraco were recovered as pteranodontians, Alanqa was recovered as a thalassodromine, and Montanazhdarcho was recovered just outside Azhdarchidae.

An alternate phylogeny of Azhdarchidae was presented by Ortiz David et al. (2022) in their description of Thanatosdrakon:

In this analysis, Alanqa is interpreted as a non-azhdarchid azhdarchoid closely related to Keresdrakon.

References

 
 
 
 

 
Berriasian first appearances
Maastrichtian extinctions
Prehistoric reptile families